This is a list of election results for the electoral district of Onkaparinga in South Australian elections.

Members for Onkaparinga

Election results

Elections in the 1960s

Elections in the 1950s

Elections in the 1940s

 Preferences were not distributed.

Elections in the 1930s

References

South Australian state electoral results by district